Anton Sergeyevich Mamonov (born 19 September 1989) is a Russian former professional football player.

Club career
He made his debut in the Russian Premier League on 9 August 2009 for FC Khimki in a game against FC Rostov.

External links

References

1989 births
People from Ivanteyevka
Living people
Russian footballers
Russian Premier League players
FC Khimki players
FC Torpedo Moscow players
FC Dynamo Bryansk players
Association football forwards
FC SKA Rostov-on-Don players
Sportspeople from Moscow Oblast